The SureFly is a two-seat hybrid eVTOL aircraft designed by American truck-manufacturer Workhorse Group, before the program was bought by Moog Inc.  for $5 million in December 2019.

Design
The  hybrid electric has a 200-hp gasoline generator giving up to  range over 1 hour.
It has four propeller arms, each with two electric contra-rotating propellers powered by a gas turbine or piston engine generator along with a battery pack.
Targeting a price of $200,000, it can lift a  payload and includes a ballistic parachute.

The SureFly would operate as a conventional helicopter, like the similarly priced two-seat Robinson R22, but would be easier to fly and safer with its integral parachute.
SureFly has taken refundable $1,000 deposits but does not specify a delivery date, and aims to produce 1,000 per year.

The hybrid design is simpler than a pure gasoline drivetrain by eliminating the gearboxes and rotor linkages of a traditional helicopter, while security is higher through two redundant motors. Each propeller blade is driven directly by an independent electric motor and flight control is achieved by varying the RPM of each blade to achieve thrust vectoring and prevailing torque changes across the vehicle, similar to smaller multirotor unmanned aerial vehicles.
It was later upgraded with a 200-kW generator, a  payload capability and up to  range over 2 hours.

Development

After hundreds of tethered flights testing noise, battery and flight controls, it made a free first flight in spring 2018, reaching four feet during 10 seconds.
Flight tests will expand the flight envelope while FAA type certification advances.
Workhorse intends to spin off SureFly into a separate company, valuing it $33 million.

FAA type certification was applied for in fall 2018.
In October 2018, Workhorse put SureFly for sale and its latest backer, Marathon Asset Management, requires a $4 million liquidity for May 31, 2019.

In December 2019, flight controls specialist Moog Inc. bought the SureFly program for $5 million, interested by the electric power systems more than the aircraft, and will use it as an autonomous demonstrator.

Specifications

See also

References

External links
 

Electric helicopters
Proposed aircraft of the United States